São Lourenço do Bairro is a village and a civil parish of the municipality of Anadia, Portugal. The population in 2011 was 2.414, in an area of 15.38 km2.

References

Freguesias of Anadia, Portugal